Dorstenia elata is a plant species in the family Moraceae.

Description
The plant is native to the Atlantic Forest ecoregion of southeastern Brazil.

It is found in the states of Espírito Santo, Minas Gerais, and Rio de Janeiro.

Dorstenia elata is an endangered species.

Their flowers continuously bloom throughout the year.

References

elata
Endemic flora of Brazil
Flora of the Atlantic Forest
Flora of Espírito Santo
Flora of Minas Gerais
Flora of Rio de Janeiro (state)
Plants described in 1840
Critically endangered flora of South America